David George Reynolds (born 12 February 1972) is a South African composer and multi-instrumentalist whose tour de force centers on the steelpans.

Early years

Reynolds' love for music was triggered at an early age. He graduated from Rhodes University cum laude in 1993 and moved to Johannesburg where after winning a SAMRO Composer’s Award he began performing and recording alongside Tananas bass player Gito Baloi.

Over the years Reynolds has toured the world and worked in a number of projects with many musicians, a few of them includes Hugh Masekela, Sipho Gumede, Jeff Maluleke, Paul Hanmer and Pops Mohamed, Concord Nkabinde, Andy Narell.

References

Living people
1972 births
Steelpan musicians
South African musicians
South African composers
South African male composers